Bentley with Arksey is an unparished area that was a civil parish and urban district adjacent to the town of Doncaster in the West Riding of Yorkshire from 1866 to 1974.

Civil parish
The parish included the villages of Bentley, Arksey, Scawthorpe, Shaftholme and Tilts.

Urban district
On 1 April 1911 the civil parish was removed from the rural district and constituted a separate urban district. It was divided into five wards for election of members of the urban district council. The council's headquarters were in Cooke Street, Bentley.

Abolition
From 1 April 1974 the Local Government Act 1972 reorganised administrative areas throughout England and Wales. Bentley and Arksey was combined with ten other authorities to form the Metropolitan Borough of Doncaster in South Yorkshire. It now forms an unparished area within the metropolitan borough. At the census of 2001 it had a population of 33,968.

References

Unparished areas in South Yorkshire
Districts of England abolished by the Local Government Act 1972
Former civil parishes in South Yorkshire
Urban districts of England
1866 establishments in England
Geography of the Metropolitan Borough of Doncaster